Siedliska  is a village in the administrative district of Gmina Fajsławice, within Krasnystaw County, Lublin Voivodeship, in eastern Poland.

The village has a population of 520.

References

Siedliska